Arachis repens (Portuguese common name: grama-amendoim, ″peanut grass″) is a species in the family Fabaceae native to Brazil. This plant is often used as a forage and ornamental plant.

References
Tcacenco, Fernando Adami. Evaluation of native and naturalized forage plants in the Itajaí Valley, State of Santa Catarina, Brazil. Pesquisa Agropecuária Brasileira, Brasília (29): 3, 1994 March. (Abstract in English)

repens
Forages
Flora of Brazil